Michael Joseph Boxall (born 18 August 1988) is a New Zealand footballer who currently plays for Minnesota United in Major League Soccer, and the New Zealand national football team.

Early career in New Zealand 
For high school, Boxall attended and played for Mount Albert Grammar School. With Boxall anchoring the defence, Mount Albert won the league title in 2004 and 2005 and placed first at the national tournament in 2005. In his senior season in 2006, Boxall was named the team captain. He led the team to a second Knockout Cup title in three years. They also went to the Auckland Secondary School Soccer Association Championship. Mt. Albert went on to finish second at nationals that year.

Boxall played for a number of teams in his native New Zealand including Ellerslie AFC, Three Kings United, Central United, and Auckland City FC, leading Central United to the 2007 Lotto Sport Italia NRFL Premier title. In addition, Boxall won the NZFC with Auckland City, where he made 6 appearances that year despite scoring zero goals.  He was named the Auckland City Young Player of the Year with Central United in 2006 and then again with Auckland City F.C. in 2007.

US college 
Boxall was recruited to play college soccer at the University of California, Santa Barbara by head coach Tim Vom Steeg. He followed in the footsteps of other New Zealand players at Santa Barbara such as Tony Lochhead and Neil Jones, both of whom have received senior international caps after appearing for UCSB. In his first season with the Gauchos, Boxall played in 12 games, starting 10 of them. He scored no points and only had one shot on goal, but proved himself to be a solid defensive rock alongside Gaucho defensive stalwart Andy Iro. Boxall's season was cut short due to a knee injury which forced him to miss the rest of the year. Despite missing half the season, Boxall led all rookies with 10 starts and tied for the team high in both yellow cards and red cards, 6 and 1 respectively.

Personal life 

Boxall is half Samoan and is the older brother of New Zealand international footballer Nikko Boxall.

Professional

Vancouver Whitecaps FC 
Boxall was selected first overall in the 2011 MLS Supplemental Draft by Vancouver Whitecaps FC. He agreed to terms with the club on 17 March 2011, and made his professional debut on 19 March, in Vancouver's 2011 MLS opener against Toronto FC. After appearing in three matches for the Whitecaps in the 2012 season, Boxall was waived on 22 June 2012.

Wellington Phoenix 
On 10 July 2012 it was confirmed by the club that Boxall officially joined the Wellington Phoenix of his native New Zealand on a two-year contract. Instrumental in signing Boxall was Ricki Herbert, coach of both the Phoenix and the New Zealand national team at the time. Boxall made his debut for the club on 14 October 2012, in the 1–1 away draw against Melbourne Heart in Round 2. After a beginning to his time in Wellington which saw him play backup to Ben Sigmund and Andrew Durante, Boxall was loaned to the Oakleigh Cannons of the Victorian Premier League.   Following a disappointing first season with the Phoenix, Boxall signed a 1-year contract extension on 15 January 2014. Boxall stated the direction that the club was going under new head coach Ernie Merrick was the deciding factor in signing a new deal with the club. In the 2013–14 season, Boxall appeared in 20 games for the Phoenix, starting 18.

International 

Boxall has represented New Zealand at various international levels. His début with the national set up was with the Junior All-Whites (U-20's) in which he made 14 appearances with no goals. During this time, he appeared in the 2007 U-20 World Cup OFC qualifying tournament and ultimately the 2007 FIFA U-20 World Cup. He played in all three U-20 World Cup games before New Zealand were knocked out.

Boxall has also represented the New Zealand U-23 Olympic team, known as the Oly-Whites. He played in all 5 2008 OFC Olympic Qualifiers which saw New Zealand advance to their first ever Olympic Games. At the 2008 Summer Olympics, Boxall again appeared in all three of New Zealand's games before they were eliminated. In addition to these 8 games, he played four Olympic warm-up matches against Central Coast Mariners, Persikota Tangerang, Indonesia (senior squad), and Persija Jakarta between the Qualifying Tournament and the Beijing Olympic Tournament.

Boxall has made 2 appearances for New Zealand A at the Agribank Cup in Vietnam during October 2006, appearing against Thailand and Bahrain. Both games were held at the My Dinh National Stadium in Hanoi, Vietnam.

Only days after making his Whitecaps debut, Boxall was called up to the All Whites' squad for their match against China on 25 March 2011, where he came on as a second-half substitute.

Boxall was called up as one of three overage players for the New Zealand U-23 Olympic team to play at the 2020 Summer Olympics. However, a thigh injury just before the tournament meant he had to pull out of the squad.

Career statistics

Club

International 
As of 15 November 2019

Honours

Club

Auckland City FC 
 Northern Premier League Champions – 2007
 New Zealand Football Championship Champions – 2007

SuperSport United
 Nedbank Cup: 2016, 2017

International 
National team
 OFC Nations Cup: 2016

Individual 
 ACFC Young Player of the Year – 2006 and 2007
 All-Big West Honorable Mention – 2008
 All-Big West First Team – 2009
 NSCAA Third Team All-American – 2010
 College Soccer News Third Team All-America-2010
 All-Far West Region First Team – 2010
 Big West Defender of the Year – 2010

References

External links 

 
 
 NZ Football profile
 
 Wellington Phoenix player profile
 
 
 UC Santa Barbara player profile

1988 births
Living people
Auckland City FC players
Vancouver Whitecaps FC players
Vancouver Whitecaps FC U-23 players
Wellington Phoenix FC players
Association football defenders
Expatriate soccer players in Canada
New Zealand expatriate association footballers
New Zealand association footballers
New Zealand international footballers
Olympic association footballers of New Zealand
New Zealand sportspeople of Samoan descent
Association footballers from Auckland
People educated at Mount Albert Grammar School
UC Santa Barbara Gauchos men's soccer players
USL League Two players
Major League Soccer players
A-League Men players
New Zealand Football Championship players
Vancouver Whitecaps FC draft picks
Oakleigh Cannons FC players
SuperSport United F.C. players
Minnesota United FC players
Footballers at the 2008 Summer Olympics
2012 OFC Nations Cup players
2016 OFC Nations Cup players
2017 FIFA Confederations Cup players
Footballers at the 2020 Summer Olympics
New Zealand expatriate sportspeople in Canada
New Zealand expatriate sportspeople in the United States